The 2001 Japanese motorcycle Grand Prix was the first round of the 2001 Grand Prix motorcycle racing season. It took place on the weekend of 6–8 April 2001 at the Suzuka Circuit.

500 cc classification

250 cc classification

125 cc classification

Championship standings after the race (500cc)

Below are the standings for the top five riders and constructors after round one has concluded.

Riders' Championship standings

Constructors' Championship standings

 Note: Only the top five positions are included for both sets of standings.

References

External links

Japanese motorcycle Grand Prix
Japanese
Motorcycle Grand Prix